The Morane-Saulnier M.S.325 was a French Air Force fighter aircraft built by Morane-Saulnier in 1933 to meet the requirements of 1930 fighter aircraft specification. The design was unsuccessful and was abandoned in 1934.

Design and development
In 1930, when the Jockey legier Chasse, or Plan Caquot light weight fighter program was judged a failure, the Service Technique de l' Aeronautique issued the C1 (monoplace de chasse) requirement. The Morane-Saulnier submissions included the M.S.275 which retained the classic parasol monoplane configuration of preceding Morane-Saulnier fighters. In the more innovative M.S.325, a low wing, duralumin-skinned all-metal configuration was employed.

The M.S.325 was relatively modest in its concept still featuring an open cockpit (originally the tail surfaces were fabric covered) and fixed-gear with the semi-elliptical two-spar wings braced by exterior struts. The wings had two jettisonable wing root fuel tanks with a pair of  Châtellerault machine guns mounted one above each of the widely spaced landing gear legs. More unusual was that the incidence of the starboard wing greater than that of the port wing to counter torque; the engine was also canted slightly to port to counter the resultant yaw.

Operational history
M.S.325 C3 No. 01 (Works no. 4120) was flown for the first time by company Chief Test Pilot Michael Détroyat early in 1933 from the factory site at Villacoublay. The first test results were not satisfactory as tail buffeting was encountered leading to modifications that included lowering the tailplane and adding wing root fairings.

Although testing proceeded, the M.S.325 continued to be hampered by handling problems. In measuring up to other C1 competitors, the M.S.325 was relegated to an "also-ran" status and the Dewoitine D.500 became the chosen design.

Development based around a Hispano-Suiza 12Xers engine with a  cannon was proposed but eventually, the M.S.325 design was abandoned in favour of the more promising M.S.405 C.1 with only partial performance tests completed.

Specifications (M.S.325)

References

Further reading

 Brindley, John. F. French Fighters of World War Two. Windsor, UK: Hylton Lacy Publishers Ltd., 1971. .
 Green, William. War Planes of the Second World War, Volume One: Fighters. London: Macdonald & Co.(Publishers) Ltd., 1960 (tenth impression 1972). .
 Pelletier, Alain. French Fighters of World War II. Carrollton, Texas: Squadron/Signal Publications, Inc., 2002. .

Further reading

Low-wing aircraft
1930s French fighter aircraft
MS.325
Single-engined tractor aircraft